We Got Love may refer to:

 We Got Love (album), a 2017 album by The Kelly Family
 "We Got Love" (Bobby Rydell song), 1959
 "We Got Love" (Disco Montego song), 2001
 "We Got Love" (Jessica Mauboy song), Australian entry in the Eurovision Song Contest 2018
 "We Got Love" (Sigala song), a 2019 Sigala song featuring Ella Henderson
 "We Got Love" (Teyana Taylor song), a 2019 Teyana Taylor song
 "We Got Love", a bonus song on The Beach Boys' album Holland

See also
 "We Got the Love", a 1993 song by Restless Heart